Rishta Hai Pyar Ka is a Pakistani Urdu black-and-white film directed by Qamar Zaidi and produced by Iqbal Butt & Fazal Kareem. The film cast Waheed Murad, Zeba, Iqbal Yousuf, Hanif, Farida and Adeeb. Rishta Hai Pyar Ka is cited as the first Lollywood film to be filmed in abroad, Beirut, London and Paris.

Cast 
 Zeba
 Waheed Murad
 Hanif
 Iqbal Yousuf
 Trannum
 Adeeb
 Azad

Release 
Rishta hai pyar ka was released on 6 October 1967 in Pakistani cinemas. In spite of great location and cast, the film failed to become a blockbuster hit. The film completed only 6 weeks on main cinemas and 29 weeks on other cinemas in Karachi and, thus, became a Silver Jubilee film.

Music 
The music of the film is composed by the renowned music director Nashad and the songs are written by Fayyaz Hashmi. Playback singers are Ahmed Rushdi, Runa Laila, Masood Rana, Irene Parveen and Muneer Hussein.

Songography 
"Masoom sa chehra..." by Ahmad Rushdi and Runa Laila
"Bari mehrbani, bari hi inayat..." by Masood Rana
"Zalim ne aaj nahin ki..." by Muneer Hussein and Irene Parveen
"Zakhmay dil chupa kay roain gay..." by Naseem Baygum

References

External links 
 

1960s Urdu-language films
Pakistani romantic drama films
1967 films
Films scored by Nashad
Films shot in Paris
Films shot in London
Films shot in Lebanon

Pakistani black-and-white films
Urdu-language Pakistani films